Kazem Khavazi (Persian: کاظم خاوازی ; born in 1968 in Birjand, Iran), is the former minister of agricultural jihad in the second government of Hassan Rouhani, who was previously deputy minister and head of the Iranian Institute for Agricultural Research, Education and Extension.

References

1968 births
Living people
Iranian politicians